Beets may refer to:

 Beetroot (vegetable)
 Beet plant (plant of the vegetable)

Places
 Beets, Netherlands, a village
 Nij Beets, Netherlands (New Beets), a village

People 
 Betty Lou Beets (1937–2000) executed U.S. murderer
 Dora Beets (1812–1864) Dutch writer
 Nicolaas Beets (1814–1903) Dutch theologian
 Peter Beets (born 1971) Dutch jazz pianist
 Pieter Beets (1900–1996) Dutch cyclist
 Sonja Beets (born 1953) Dutch musician
 Tinker Beets (born 1941) cricketer for Rhodesia
 Tom Beets, Belgian musician, member of the Flanders Recorder Quartet

Other uses
 The Beets, a band from New York
 The Beets, a fictional band from the animated television series Doug
 Beets Special, single seat recreational kit plane

See also 

 Beet (disambiguation)